Pamela A. Nelson (born June 30, 1946) is an American former politician. She served in the South Dakota House of Representatives from 1979 to 1986 and in the Senate from 1989 to 1996.

References

1946 births
Living people
People from Sioux Falls, South Dakota
Women state legislators in South Dakota
Democratic Party members of the South Dakota House of Representatives
Democratic Party South Dakota state senators
20th-century American politicians
20th-century American women politicians
21st-century American women